Trackdown is a 1976 American crime drama exploitation film directed by Richard T. Heffron and starring James Mitchum and Karen Lamm.

Plot
A rancher's sister runs away from her Montana home for an exciting life in Los Angeles. However, she is abducted and sold into sexual slavery by a gang. Her brother comes to the city to find her, and when the police won't help, he takes the law into his own hands.

Cast
James Mitchum as Jim Calhoun
Karen Lamm as Betsy Calhoun
Anne Archer as Barbara
Erik Estrada as Chucho 
Cathy Lee Crosby as Lynn Strong

Soundtrack
The film features the song "Runaway Girl" performed by country Western singer Kenny Rogers.

DVD release date

The film is on DVD by Shout! Factory. It was released on November 12, 2013, as part  of Shout's Action Packed Movie Marathon,  Vol. 2.

References

External links

1976 films
1976 crime drama films
American action drama films
Works about human trafficking
Works about sex trafficking
Human trafficking in the United States
Films directed by Richard T. Heffron
Films scored by Charles Bernstein
Films set in Los Angeles
United Artists films
1970s English-language films
1970s American films